The Ambassador from New Zealand to Argentina is New Zealand's foremost diplomatic representative in the Argentine Republic, and in charge of New Zealand's diplomatic mission in Argentina.

The embassy is located in Buenos Aires, Argentina's capital city.  New Zealand has maintained a resident ambassador in Argentina since 1998.  The Ambassador to Argentina is concurrently accredited to Paraguay and Uruguay.

List of heads of mission

Ambassadors to Argentina

Non-resident ambassadors, resident in Lima
 Peter Bennett (1987–1988)
 Barry Brooks (1988–1990)

Non-resident ambassadors, resident in Santiago
 Paul Tipping (1990–1992)
 Frank Wilson (1992–1996)
 David McKee (1996–1998)

Resident ambassadors
 Caroline Forsyth (1998–2001)
 Carl Worker (2001–2005)
 Lucy Duncan (2005–2010)
 Darryl Dunn (2010–2013)
 Hayden Montgomery (2013–2016)
 Carl Worker (2019–

See also
 Argentina–New Zealand relations

References
 New Zealand Heads of Overseas Missions: Argentina.  New Zealand Ministry of Foreign Affairs and Trade.  Retrieved on 2008-03-29.

Argentina, Ambassadors from New Zealand to
New Zealand
Argentina–New Zealand relations